Zoega or Zoëga is a surname. Notable people with the surname include:

 David Zoëga Di Maria (born 1990), Danish artist
 Björn Zoëga (born 1964), Icelandic orthopedic surgeon
 Georg Zoëga (1755–1809), Danish archaeologist and numismatist, brother of Johan
 Gylfi Zoega (born 1963), Icelandic economist
 Johan Zoëga (1742–1788), Danish entomologist and botanist